Portrait of Ambroise Vollard in a Red Headscarf (French:Ambroise Vollard au foulard rouge) is an oil on canvas portrait by Pierre-Auguste Renoir of his art dealer Ambroise Vollard, created c. 1899. It is housed in the Petit Palais in Paris.

Description 
A large bald man, Vollard is pictured in this portrait in profile dressed in a brown wool cloth suit, with characteristically downcast eyes. He wears a red headscarf that has been tied behind his neck, which serves as a reminder of his origins and upbringing on the Indian Ocean island of Réunion.

Other portraits 
Vollard was not averse to posing for a portrait and was painted by Renoir on at least two other occasions (conventionally suited in 1908 and dressed as a matador in 1917), as well as by some of Renoir's contemporaries.

References

Portraits by Pierre-Auguste Renoir
1911 paintings
Paintings in the collection of the Petit Palais
Vollard
Vollard